Harry Glaß (11 October 1930 – 13 December 1997) was a German ski jumper. Born in Klingenthal, he won a Bronze medal in the Individual Large Hill event at the 1956 Winter Olympics.

Glaß, who is not related to fellow East German jumper Henry Glaß of the 1970s, started training as jumper in 1952, and became a member of the GDR-team in 1953. A change in style after 1954 helped him win the medal in 1956. The ski jump career of the Volkspolizei police man, GDR champion of 1954, 1955, 1956 and 1958, ended in 1960 due to a fall during  Vierschanzentournee at Bergiselschanze. A later attempt for a comeback failed. He died in Rodewisch in December 1997.

References 
 
 

1930 births
1997 deaths
German male ski jumpers
Olympic ski jumpers of the United Team of Germany
Olympic bronze medalists for the United Team of Germany
Olympic medalists in ski jumping
Ski jumpers at the 1956 Winter Olympics
Medalists at the 1956 Winter Olympics
People from Klingenthal
Sportspeople from Saxony
People of the Stasi